Waioli may be,

Waioli language, Indonesia
Waioli Mission District, Hawaii